Gamamundo is a sector in the Bafata Region of Guinea-Bissau.

Bafatá Region
Sectors of Guinea-Bissau
Populated places in Guinea-Bissau